Hayami (written: 速見, 速水 or 早見) is a Japanese surname and can refer to:
Yuji Hayami, science fiction and fantasy writer.
Masaru Hayami (1925-2009), Japanese businessman from Kobe.
Yū Hayami, J-pop singer and TV actress.
Mokomichi Hayami (born 1984), Japanese actor.
Gyoshū Hayami (1894-1935), Japanese painter in the Nihonga style.
Saori Hayami (born 1991), Japanese voice actress and singer.
Show Hayami (born 1958), Japanese voice actor and singer. 
Noriko Hayami (born 1959), Japanese actress.
 Dogen Handa (1914-1974), known as Hayami Handa, a professional Go player.

Fictional characters
Atsushi Hayami, one of the main protagonists in Gunparade March.
Daisuke Hayami, from MegaMan NT Warrior (Rockman EXE) anime and manga.
Kohinata Hayami, H2O: Footprints in the Sand character.
Rena Hayami, R:Racing Evolution character.
Takumi Hayami, Sky Girls character.
, a character in the Assassination Classroom anime and manga
Umika Hayami, a character in Kaitou Sentai Lupinranger VS Keisatsu Sentai Patranger.
Sena Hayami, a character in Mashin Sentai Kiramager.

See also
Hayami District, Ōita

Japanese-language surnames